The 2019 VTV9 - Binh Dien International Women's Volleyball Cup is the 13th iteration of the VTV9 - Binh Dien International Women's Volleyball Cup. The tournament was held in Kiên Giang, Vietnam.

Pools

Pool standing procedure 
 Number of matches won
 Match points
 Sets ratio
 Points ratio
 Result of the last match between the tied teams

Match won 3–0 or 3–1: 3 match points for the winner, 0 match points for the loser
Match won 3–2: 2 match points for the winner, 1 match point for the loser

Preliminary round
All times are Vietnam Standard Time (UTC+07:00).

Pool A

   

|}

|}

Pool B

        
|}

|}

Classification 5th-8th
All times are Vietnam Standard Time (UTC+07:00).

Classification 5th-8th

|}

7th place

|}

5th place

|}

Final round
All times are Vietnam Standard Time (UTC+07:00).

Semifinals

|}

3rd place

|}

Final

|}

Final standing

Team Roster
Huang He, Su Weiping, Zhang Jialing, Zhang Honglin, Wang Chen, Tang Weidan, Zhang Xiaoya, Chen Biaobiao, Yang Menglu, Liu Meiling, 
Head Coach:

Awards

Most Valuable Player
  Lindsay Stalzer (Bring It Promotions)

Best Setter
  Wang Chen (Sichuan)

Best Outside Hitters
  Trần Thị Thanh Thúy (VTV Bình Điền Long An)
  Zhang Honglin (Sichuan)

Best Middle Blockers
  Samantha Cash (Bring It Promotions)
  Zhang Xiaoya (Sichuan)

Best Opposite Spiker
  Thanacha Sooksod (Thailand U23)

Best Libero
  Nguyễn Thị Kim Liên (VTV Bình Điền Long An)

Best Young Player
  Hoàng Thị Kiều Trinh (Thông tin LVPB)

Miss Volleyball
  Đặng Thị Kim Thanh (VTV Bình Điền Long An)

See also
VTV9 - Binh Dien International Women's Volleyball Cup

References

External links
vtvbinhdiencup.vn
 volleyball.vn

VTV9 – Binh Dien International Women's Volleyball Cup
Voll
2019 in women's volleyball
VTV9 – Binh Dien International Women's Volleyball Cup